Hybadae or Hybadai was a deme of ancient Attica, of the phyle of Leontis, sending one or two delegates to the Athenian Boule. 

Its site is unlocated.

References

Populated places in ancient Attica
Former populated places in Greece
Demoi
Lost ancient cities and towns